These are the New Territories East results of the 2000 Hong Kong legislative election. The election was held on 10 September 2000 and all 5 seats in New Territories East where consisted of North District, Tai Po District, Sai Kung District and Sha Tin District were contested. The Democratic Party gained one new seat with Wong Sing-chi, as Cyd Ho of The Frontier ran in Hong Kong Island.

Overall results
Before election:

Change in composition:

Candidates list

See also
Legislative Council of Hong Kong
Hong Kong legislative elections
2000 Hong Kong legislative election

References

2000 Hong Kong legislative election